Codename: Dustsucker, stylised as ///CODENAME: dustsucker, is the second studio album by English post-rock band Bark Psychosis. It was released on 28 July 2004 on Fire Records. The album was recorded at DustSuckerSound, a private studio run by Bark Psychosis member Graham Sutton in east London, between 1999 and 2004. It notably features the contributions of Lee Harris, the drummer and percussionist of early post-rock purveyors Talk Talk.

"400 Winters", along with remixes of three of the album's other tracks, was released as an titled "400 Winters" EP in 2005.

Composition
The band continues to use conventional rock instruments in songs that are structured unconventionally, as they did in their earlier releases. Rather than the familiar alternation of verse and chorus, the songs mostly develop as a succession of related sections. "400 Winters" has an intro, a verse, a long chorus-like section, then the rhythm and arrangement change for a long coda section, which fades to be replaced by a chord sequence on piano and what appears to be a distorted answerphone message. "Shapeshifting" follows a similar structure. "Burning the City" is based around a three bar pattern, in contrast to rock's usual 4, 8 or 12 bar structures.

Critical reception 

The album has received generally positive reviews. A contemporary review in the American music magazine CMJ compared the band and album's sound to fellow English compatriots Elbow and Doves, and positively wrote that listeners "may have to scour the import bins for this one, but you'll thank us for the heads up." In an October 2004 review by Sab Ubl for Pitchfork, the album's sound is described as "utterly unique," with Ubl also writing that "what the songs lack in structural certainty or melodic eloquence they usually make up for in the remarkable depth and vibrancy of their textures." In December 2004, American webzine Somewhere Cold ranked Codename: Dustsucker No. 1 on their 2004 Somewhere Cold Awards Hall of Fame list.

Track listing
Track #5 is alternatively written as "Dr. Innocuous-Ketamoid" on a few releases, such as on Spotify and a promo CDr issued by Fire Records in 2018.

Personnel
Musicians
Graham Sutton – vocals (1, 2, 3, 6, 7), guitar, bass guitar, piano, keys, melodica, e-mu
Lee Harris – drums, percussion
Colin Bradley – guitar
Pete Beresford – vibraphone
Rachel Dreyer – piano, vocals (8)
T. J. Mackenzie – trumpet
Anja Buechele – vocals (4, 6)
Chicken – gonk vocal
Neil Aldridge – indicators
Shaun Hyder – sindhi tamboura
David Panos – bass guitar
Alice Kemp – bowed guitar
Silke Roch – vocals (9)
Mark Simnett – found drums
Del Crabtree – found trumpet

Technical personnel
Graham Sutton – engineering, production, mastering
Noel Summerville – mastering

References

External links
Bark Psychosis Official Site
Fire Records

Codename Dustsucker
Bark Psychosis albums
Fire Records (UK) albums